Spasskoye is a rural locality in Vysoksky Selsoviet Rural Settlement, Medvensky District, Kursk Oblast, Russia. Population:

Geography 
The village is located on the Reut River (a left tributary of the Seym), 57 km from the Russia–Ukraine border, 33 km south-west of Kursk, 12 km north-west of the district center – the urban-type settlement Medvenka, 6 km from the selsoviet center – Vysokoye.

 Climate
Spasskoye has a warm-summer humid continental climate (Dfb in the Köppen climate classification).

Transport 

The rural locality is situated 42 km from Kursk Vostochny Airport, 100 km from Belgorod International Airport and 232 km from Voronezh Peter the Great Airport.

References

Notes

Sources

Rural localities in Medvensky District